Charles Noble (July 4, 1797December 26, 1874) was a Michigan politician.

Early life
Charles Noble was born on July 4, 1797, in Williamstown, Massachusetts to parents Deodatus and Betsey Noble. He graduated from Williams College in 1815, and was admitted to the bar in 1818.

Career
Later in 1818, Noble first went to Cleveland, Ohio for a spell, but then moved to Monroe, Michigan where he started practicing law, and continued to do so until 1867. Noble was a member of the Michigan Territorial Council from Monroe County from 1828 to 1829. On November 8, 1854, Noble was elected to the Michigan House of Representatives where he represented the Wayne County 3rd district from January 3, 1855 to 1856. Noble was a member of the Whig Party while the party existed. After it dissolved, Noble became an independent. In 1867, Noble moved to Detroit where he got into the business of buying and selling pine lands until his death.

Personal life
Noble married Eliza Sims Wing on May 16, 1823.

Death
Noble died on December 26, 1874. Noble was interred at Woodland Cemetery in Monroe.

References

1797 births
1874 deaths
Burials in Michigan
People from Williamstown, Massachusetts
People from Monroe, Michigan
Politicians from Detroit
Lawyers from Detroit
Members of the Michigan Territorial Legislature
Members of the Michigan House of Representatives
Williams College alumni
Michigan Whigs
Michigan Independents
19th-century American lawyers
19th-century American politicians